William Buller (born 17 September 1992) is a British racing driver.

Career

T Cars
After successful spells in both karting and mini stocks, Buller made his circuit racing debut in the 2007 T Cars championship; the series designed for aspiring racing drivers between fourteen and seventeen years of age. Driving for Calvin Motorsport, Buller finished as series runner-up behind Daniel Brown, winning five races, including a hat-trick at Brands Hatch and finished on the podium in a further five races.

Formula BMW
Despite being only fifteen, Buller moved up into the newly created Formula BMW Europe series for 2008, which had been formed from the merger of the British and German series. Driving for Fortec Motorsport, Buller took twelfth in the championship standings, taking the fastest lap at the final race at Monza. Buller also made a guest appearance in the Formula BMW Americas series, driving for Autotecnica at the -supporting rounds of the championship. He finished fourteenth and ninth in the two races, and also finished ninth in the World Final for EuroInternational.

At the conclusion of the season, Buller competed in the Winter Series of both the British and Portuguese Formula Renault series, and also the Toyota Racing Series in New Zealand. He finished fifth in both Formula Renault championships, and he finished in the top ten of the Toyota Racing Series, despite competing in only three of the six rounds.

Buller returned to Formula BMW in 2009, again staying with Fortec. A first win proved elusive, although he did take a pole position at Silverstone, and also finished third at the Nürburgring, en route to tenth in the championship. Buller made a guest appearance for EuroInternational at the final round of the Formula BMW Pacific championship in Macau. He dominated the weekend, winning from pole position with fastest lap to boot, holding off team-mate Jim Pla to win the race.

Formula Three
Buller will move into the British Formula 3 Championship for the 2010 season, driving for Hitech Racing. Prior to the season beginning, he also won the inaugural Formula 3 Brazil Open race in São Paulo for Hitech, his debut in a Formula Three car.

In April 2012 it was confirmed that Buller would join Carlin for the newly christened European F3 Championship. The calendar will comprise eight F3 Euro Series rounds and a pair of events from the British championship.

In 2013 Buller started the FIA European Formula Three Championship with Threebond by T-Sport driving a Nissan powered Dallara F312. During winter testing he proved to be quick, regularly topping the timing sheets. When results during the first part of the season did not match the expectations, the British driver decided to halt the campaign and focus on the British F3 Championship with Fortec Motorsport.

GP3 Series
Buller will also compete in the GP3 Series in 2012, again linking up with the Carlin squad. He had a fairly quiet season, apart from an incredible victory from the back of the grid at Silverstone in Race Two. However, despite tying with teammate António Félix da Costa for best victory of the season, Buller was not retained by the team for 2013.

Formula Renault 3.5
In 2013, Formula Renault 3.5 team Zeta Corse confirmed Buller to be their sixth driver in only four race weekends after Emmanuel Piget, Mihai Marinescu, Mathéo Tuscher, Carlos Sainz Jr. and Nick Yelloly. Buller made his debut at Moscow Raceway in Russia, and in the first race finished a very strong fifth place. He followed that up with a fifth and sixth-place finishes at the Red Bull Ring in Austria alongside new teammate Riccardo Agostini.

Buller stated his desire to continue his Formula Renault 3.5 campaign with Zeta after confirming his discontinuation of his European Formula Three campaign for 2013, and running alongside his British Formula 3 campaign.

Super Formula
In 2015, Buller sign to Kondo Racing for Japanese Super Formula series. Teammate is the British driver James Rossiter.

SXS Racing 
In 2020, Buller took up highly competitive off-road Side by Side racing - sxsracing.co.uk . Initially starting out in a 1000cc Yamaha YXZ, Buller placed 6th in the 1000 Experts class in 2021. The start of the 2022 season saw Buller switch to a more commonly used machine, the Polaris RS1.

Racing record

Career summary

Complete Formula 3 Euroseries results
(key) (Races in bold indicate pole position; races in italics indicate fastest lap)

Complete FIA European Formula 3 Championship results
(key)

Complete GP3 Series results
(key) (Races in bold indicate pole position) (Races in italics indicate fastest lap)

Complete Formula Renault 3.5 Series results
(key) (Races in bold indicate pole position) (Races in italics indicate fastest lap)

Complete Super Formula Results
(key) (Races in bold indicate pole position; races in italics indicate fastest lap)

Personal life
Buller's hobbies are water sports, training and playing football. His favourite drivers are Fernando Alonso and Kimi Räikkönen, while his favourite circuits are Circuit de Spa-Francorchamps and Rockingham Motor Speedway.

References

External links
 
 

1992 births
Living people
Sportspeople from County Down
Racing drivers from Northern Ireland
Super Formula drivers
World Series Formula V8 3.5 drivers
GP3 Series drivers
Formula 3 Euro Series drivers
British Formula Three Championship drivers
FIA Formula 3 European Championship drivers
Formula BMW Europe drivers
Formula BMW USA drivers
Formula BMW Pacific drivers
British Formula Renault 2.0 drivers
Portuguese Formula Renault 2.0 drivers
Toyota Racing Series drivers
Carlin racing drivers
Arden International drivers
T-Sport drivers
Fortec Motorsport drivers
EuroInternational drivers
Hitech Grand Prix drivers
Zeta Corse drivers
Kondō Racing drivers
RP Motorsport drivers
Signature Team drivers